The First National Bank of Glasgow in Glasgow, Montana was built in 1914.  It was listed on the National Register of Historic Places in 2002.

It is a two-story L-shaped building which was designed by Buechner & Orth in Beaux Arts style.  It has also been known as Langen Building and as Irving Building.

References

National Register of Historic Places in Valley County, Montana
Beaux-Arts architecture in Montana
Buildings and structures completed in 1914
Glasgow, Montana
Bank buildings on the National Register of Historic Places in Montana